Action film actors appear in action movies, a film genre in which one or more heroes are thrust into a series of challenges that typically include physical feats, extended fight scenes, violence, and frantic chases. Action films tend to feature a resourceful character struggling against incredible odds, which include life-threatening situations, a villain, or a pursuit which generally concludes in victory for the hero.

Notable actors 

Scott Adkins
Ben Affleck 
Carlos Agassi
Malin Åkerman
Jessica Alba
Jestoni Alarcon
Karen Allen
Vidyut Jammwal
Anthony Alonzo
Dan Alvaro
Gerald Anderson
Gillian Anderson
Jun Aristorenas
Cüneyt Arkın
Steve Austin
Morena Baccarin
Kevin Bacon
Adam Baldwin
Christian Bale
Antonio Banderas
Drew Barrymore
Angela Bassett
Dave Bautista
Sean Bean
Kate Beckinsale
Zoë Bell
David Belle
Jean-Paul Belmondo
Jim Belushi
Julie Benz
Tom Berenger
Kathryn Bernardo
Daniel Bernhardt
Halle Berry
Michael Biehn
Jessica Biel
Shane Black
Emily Blunt
Christian Boeving
Bernard Bonnin
Johnny Yong Bosch
Brian Bosworth
Kate Bosworth
Jeff Bridges
Josh Brolin
Charles Bronson
Pierce Brosnan
Jim Brown
Reb Brown
Sandra Bullock
Richard Burgi
Gerard Butler
Nicolas Cage
Michael Caine
David Caruso
Bruce Campbell
Gina Carano
Charisma Carpenter
Lynda Carter
Henry Cavill
John Cena
Danny Chan Kwok Kwan
Jackie Chan
Maggie Cheung
David Chiang
Shin'ichi Chiba
Cheng Pei-pei
Chin Kar-lok
Chow Yun-fat
George Clooney
Jennifer Connelly
Sean Connery
Dominic Cooper
Kevin Costner
Jai Courtney
Randy Couture
Daniel Craig
Terry Crews
Russell Crowe
Tom Cruise
Penélope Cruz
Jamie Lee Curtis
John Cusack
Mark Dacascos
Timothy Dalton
Matt Damon
Gary Daniels
Dingdong Dantes
Ricky Davao
Robert Davi
Keith David
Geena Davis
Michael de Mesa
Robert De Niro
Monsour del Rosario
Benicio del Toro
Alain Delon
Sunny Deol
Johnny Depp
Ajay Devgn
Cameron Diaz
Joko Diaz
Vin Diesel
Lexa Doig
Kirk Douglas
Robert Downey Jr.
Michael Dudikoff
Bill Duke
Eliza Dushku
Sanjay Dutt
Clint Eastwood
Gigi Edgley
Jesse Eisenberg
E.R. Ejercito
Idris Elba
Cary Elwes
Emilio Estevez
Gary Estrada
Jinggoy Estrada
Joseph Estrada
Chris Evans
Ejay Falcon
Colin Farrell
Oded Fehr
Mark Anthony Fernandez
Rudy Fernandez 
Tony Ferrer
Lou Ferrigno
Nathan Fillion
Colin Firth
Laurence Fishburne
Harrison Ford
William Forsythe
Ben Foster
Jamie Foxx
Jason David Frank
Rila Fukushima
Gal Gadot
Eddie Garcia
Andrew Garfield
Jennifer Garner
Sarah Michelle Gellar
Janno Gibbs
Mel Gibson
Danny Glover
Cuba Gooding Jr.
John Goodman
Suresh Gopi
Joseph Gordon-Levitt
Louis Gossett Jr.
Kelsey Grammer
Erin Gray
Pam Grier
Frank Grillo
Michael Gross
Richard Gutierrez
Jake Gyllenhaal
Gene Hackman
Linda Hamilton
Armie Hammer
Daryl Hannah
Tom Hanks
Tom Hardy
Danielle Harris
Naomie Harris
David Hasselhoff
Anne Hathaway
Rutger Hauer
Salma Hayek
Tricia Helfer
Chris Hemsworth
Liam Hemsworth
Lance Henriksen
Mark Herras
Hulk Hogan
Djimon Hounsou
Sibelle Hu
Vanessa Hudgens
Ernie Hudson
Brent Huff
Sammo Hung
Josh Hutcherson
Rhene Imperial
Kadir İnanır
Michael Ironside
Jason Isaacs
Tony Jaa
Hugh Jackman
Kate Jackson
Samuel L. Jackson
Thomas Jane
Famke Janssen
Scarlett Johansson
Don Johnson
Dwayne Johnson
Angelina Jolie
Felicity Jones
Sam J. Jones
Tommy Lee Jones
Vinnie Jones
Michael B. Jordan
Milla Jovovich
Meiko Kaji
Lau Kar-leung
Michael Keaton
Toby Kebbell
Shah Rukh Khan
Cynthia Khan
Rinko Kikuchi
Val Kilmer
Ben Kingsley
Ravi Teja
Takeshi Kitano
Keira Knightley 
Kane Kosugi
Shô Kosugi
Martin Kove
Akshay Kumar
Chiaki Kuriyama
Aaron Kwok
Shia LaBeouf
Lorenzo Lamas
Christopher Lambert
Burt Lancaster
Sonny Landham
Jess Lapid, Jr.
Jess Lapid, Sr.
Lito Lapid
Mark Lapid
Sanaa Lathan
Andy Lau
Taylor Lautner
Lucy Lawless
Jennifer Lawrence
Martin Lawrence
Bruce Lee
Jason Scott Lee
Lee Min-ho
Moon Lee
Kier Legaspi
Zoren Legaspi
Jet Li
Lucy Liu
Angel Locsin
Dolph Lundgren
Kellan Lutz
Michael Madsen
Tobey Maguire
Robert Maillet
John Malkovich
Rey Malonzo
Joe Manganiello
Edu Manzano
Baldo Marro
Coco Martin
Lee Marvin
Matt McColm
Matthew McConaughey
Mary McDonnell
Rose McGowan
Steve McQueen
Ian McShane
Johnny Messner
Sasha Mitchell
Rhona Mitra
Mohanlal
Jason Momoa
Cesar Montano    
Demi Moore
Roger Moore
Chloë Grace Moretz
Carrie-Anne Moss
Eddie Murphy
Liam Neeson
Nichelle Nichols
Rachel Nichols
Jack Nicholson
Brigitte Nielsen
Connie Nielsen
Chuck Norris
Edward Norton
Timothy Olyphant
Victor Ortiz
Yukari Ôshima
Clive Owen
Al Pacino
Daniel Padilla
Robin Padilla
Rommel Padilla
Michael Paré
Anne Parillaud
Ray Park
Sonny Parsons
Robert Patrick
Guy Pearce
Ron Perlman
William Petersen
Alex Pettyfer
Ryan Phillippe
Lou Diamond Phillips
Chris Pine
Brad Pitt
Fernando Poe Jr.
Glen Powell
Chris Pratt
Freddie Prinze Jr.
Dominic Purcell
Maggie Q
Dennis Quaid
Puneeth Rajkumar
Cyril Raffaelli
Derek Ramsay
Keanu Reeves
John Regala
James Remar
Jeremy Renner
Jean Reno
Ramon "Bong" Revilla Jr.
Ramon Revilla, Sr.
Efren Reyes Jr.
Efren Reyes Sr.
Burt Reynolds
Ryan Reynolds
Ving Rhames
Ronnie Ricketts
 Marian Rivera
 Eric Roberts
Bembol Roco
Eddie Rodriguez
Michelle Rodriguez
Miguel Rodriguez
Henry Rollins
Michael Rooker
Hrithik Roshan
Cynthia Rothrock
Richard Roundtree
Mickey Rourke
Ronda Rousey
Paul Rudd
Kurt Russell
Jeri Ryan
Katee Sackhoff
Zoe Saldana
Phillip Salvador
Raymart Santiago
Susan Sarandon
Romnick Sarmenta
Catherine Schell
Arnold Schwarzenegger
Steven Seagal
Tom Selleck
William Shatner
Charlie Sheen
Sunil Shetty
Robin Shou
Tiger Shroff
Elisabeth Shue
Tom Sizemore
Alexander Skarsgård
Tom Skerritt
Christian Slater
Will Smith
Wesley Snipes
Kevin Sorbo
Jeff Speakman
Sylvester Stallone
Jason Statham
Ray Stevenson
Sharon Stone
Meryl Streep
Kiefer Sutherland
Hilary Swank
Mr. T
Cary-Hiroyuki Tagawa
Amanda Tapping
Joe Taslim
Channing Tatum
Charlize Theron
Uma Thurman
Ti Lung
Gina Torres
John Travolta
Danny Trejo
Nicholas Tse
Mike Tyson
Karl Urban
Iko Uwais
Jean-Claude Van Damme
Casper Van Dien
Vic Vargas
Ronaldo Valdez
Dante Varona
Ian Veneracion
Jesse Ventura
Ace Vergel
Joseph Vijay
Sharni Vinson
Roi Vinzon
Lindsay Wagner
Mark Wahlberg
Paul Walker
Fred Ward
Denzel Washington
Emma Watson
Naomi Watts
John Wayne
Carl Weathers
Sigourney Weaver
Hugo Weaving
Zhao Wei
Raquel Welch
Peter Weller
Vernon Wells
Weng Weng
Adam West
Forest Whitaker
David A.R. White
Michael Jai White
Billy Dee Williams
Maisie Williams
Fred Williamson
Bruce Willis
Don "The Dragon" Wilson
Owen Wilson
Jeff Wincott
Shailene Woodley
Sam Worthington
Simon Yam
Yanin Vismitananda
Donnie Yen
Gong Yoo
Michelle Yeoh
Bolo Yeung
Nan Yu
Yuen Biao
Ramon Zamora
Billy Zane
Marko Zaror
Zhang Ziyi
Zaldy Zshornack
Ruby Rose
Al Leong

References

Action films
Film
Lists of film actors